Dorothy Hackett McGuire (June 14, 1916 – September 13, 2001) was an American actress. She was nominated for the Academy Award for Best Actress for Gentleman's Agreement (1947) and won the National Board of Review Award for Best Actress for Friendly Persuasion (1956). She starred as the eponymous mother in the popular film Swiss Family Robinson (1960).

Life and career

Early years
Born in Omaha, Nebraska, McGuire was the only child of Isabelle Flaherty McGuire and Thomas Johnson McGuire. She made her stage debut at age 13 at the local community playhouse in Barrie's A Kiss for Cinderella. Her co-star was Henry Fonda, who was also born in Nebraska and was making a return visit to his home town after becoming a success on Broadway.

After her father's death, McGuire attended a convent school in Indianapolis, Indiana. She later attended Pine Manor Junior College in Chestnut Hill, Massachusetts, serving as president of that school's drama club. She graduated from Pine Manor when she was 19.

Theatre and Modeling
McGuire was one of the most sought after models under Walter Thornton's management. She appeared in summer stock at Deertrees, Maine, in 1937 before going to New York.

She acted on radio, playing Sue in the serial Big Sister (1937) and took part in an experimental television broadcast, The Mysterious Mummy Case (1938). She was hired by producer Jed Harris to understudy the ingenue in a Broadway play, Stop Over (1938), which ran only 23 performances. McGuire was an understudy to Martha Scott in Our Town in 1938, eventually taking over Scott's role.

She toured in My Dear Children opposite John Barrymore, and in 1939, was in a revue with Benny Goodman, Swingin' the Dream. She had a role in the short-lived Medicine Show (1940), and a part in the longer-running revival of Kind Lady (1940).

McGuire gained attention on Broadway when cast in the title role of the domestic comedy Claudia. It ran for 722 performances from 1941 to 1943. Brooks Atkinson wrote: "She gives a splendid performance of a part that would be irritating if it were played by a dull actress. She is personally genuine; the charm she radiates across the play is not merely theatrical mannerism."

Film

Brought to Hollywood by producer David O. Selznick (who called her "a born actress") on the strength of her stage performance, McGuire starred in her first film, Claudia (1943), a movie adaptation of her Broadway success, portraying a child bride who almost destroys her marriage through her selfishness. Selznick developed the project, then sold it to 20th Century Fox; under this deal, Selznick would share McGuire's contract with Fox.

McGuire's co-star in Claudia was Robert Young, and RKO reunited them in The Enchanted Cottage (1945), which was a box-office success.

At age 28, she played the mother in A Tree Grows In Brooklyn (1945), replacing Gene Tierney, who had become pregnant. Under the direction of Elia Kazan at 20th Century Fox, the film was a big success. So, too, was The Spiral Staircase (1946) in which McGuire played the lead role, a mute. It was originally prepared by Selznick, who envisioned Ingrid Bergman in the lead; Selznick sold the project to RKO along with the services for his producer Dore Schary.

McGuire and Young made a third film together, Claudia and David (1946), a sequel to Claudia, which was less well received. Schary and RKO put her in Till the End of Time (also 1946), a hit with audiences. She later said: "I fought the hardest for this role and it was my least successful. I went right back to playing nice girls and faithful wives. "

She was offered the lead in Anna and the King of Siam (1946), but turned it down to go travelling with her family.

McGuire was nominated for the Academy Award for Best Actress for Gentleman's Agreement (1947) directed by Kazan for Fox. The film was a surprise hit.

Following this film, McGuire, co-star Gregory Peck, and some other actors helped form the La Jolla Playhouse. She appeared in productions of The Importance of Being Earnest, I Am a Camera, The Winslow Boy, and Tonight at 8:30, then went to live in Italy for a year.
 
Selznick announced a variety of films to star McGuire that were not made, including Dark Medallion, A Doll's House Wings of the Dove and Sands of Time.

Radio
McGuire was a member of the cast of Big Sister (playing Sue Evans), and Joyce Jordan, M.D.. She also appeared in This Is My Best (Miracle in the Rain), Screen Directors Playhouse (The Spiral Staircase) and in Theatre Guild on the Air (Hamlet A Doll's House, Our Town).

Later films
McGuire spent some time away from screens before returning in two movies for Fox, Mother Didn't Tell Me (1950) and Mister 880 (1950). Neither was particularly popular.

She made her TV debut in Robert Montgomery Presents, an adaptation of Dark Victory, with McGuire playing the Bette Davis role. Schary had become head of production at MGM, where McGuire appeared in Callaway Went Thataway (1951), which lost money. She did I Want You (1951) for Sam Goldwyn, then returned to Broadway for Legend of Lovers (1951–52), but it only had a short run.

McGuire made Invitation (1952) at MGM, which flopped, and Make Haste to Live (1954) at Republic. She had a huge hit with Three Coins in the Fountain (1954) at Fox and appeared in episodes of The United States Steel Hour, Lux Video Theatre, The Best of Broadway  (an adaptation of The Philadelphia Story, as Tracey Lord), and Climax!.

At MGM, she was in Trial (1955), playing Glenn Ford's love interest. The movie was a hit.

Mother roles
McGuire was cast as Gary Cooper's wife in Friendly Persuasion (1956), directed by William Wyler. The success of this performance led her to being cast in a series of "mother" roles, continuing with Old Yeller (1957) at Disney.

McGuire returned to Broadway in Winesburg, Ohio (1958), which had a short run, then she played a wife and mother in The Remarkable Mr. Pennypacker (1959) at Fox.

She played the matriarch in some melodramas: This Earth Is Mine (1959) with Jean Simmons at Universal; A Summer Place (1959) for Delmer Daves with Richard Egan , Sandra Dee and Troy Donahue at Warner Bros., a big success; and The Dark at the Top of the Stairs (1960).

She returned to Disney with Swiss Family Robinson (1960), one of the most popular films of the year. She made a second film with Daves and Donahue, Susan Slade (1961), playing a mother who passed off her daughter's illegitimate child as her own. She was a mother in Disney's Summer Magic (1963).

McGuire played the Virgin Mary in The Greatest Story Ever Told (1965). She was off screen for a number of years before returning in a British family film, Flight of the Doves (1971).

Television
McGuire appeared in some TV movies, She Waits (1972) and a PBS adaptation of Another Part of the Forest (1972). She provided voice work for Jonathan Livingston Seagull (1973), and made one final appearance on Broadway in a revival of The Night of the Iguana (1976–77) alongside Richard Chamberlain.

Most of McGuire's later career work was for the small screen: The Runaways (1975), Rich Man, Poor Man (1976), the pilot for Little Women (1976), The Incredible Journey of Doctor Meg Laurel (1979), Ghost Dancing (1983), Amos (1985), Between the Darkness and the Dawn (1985), American Geisha (1986), Caroline? (1990), and The Last Best Year (1990).

She was also in episodes of Fantasy Island, Hotel, The Love Boat, Glitter, St. Elsewhere, and Highway to Heaven. She provided the narration for Summer Heat (1987), and toured in 1987 in I Never Sang for My Father.

In 1982, she said, "I love my career, but I never felt much about it--about how to nurture it...It's been very erratic, after all ... To this day, I don't know what shapes a Hollywood career ... I was never a classic beauty. I had no image, so I found myself in a lot of things accidentally."

Personal life and death
Married to Life magazine photographer John Swope for more than 35 years, she had a son, photographer Mark Swope, and a daughter, actress Topo Swope. She is also the aunt of an Indonesian-American actress, medical doctor and Miss International Indonesia 2022, Cindy May McGuire.

McGuire died of cardiac arrest on September 13, 2001, following a brief illness, at the age of 85.

Recognition
For her contribution to the motion-picture industry, Dorothy McGuire has a star on the Hollywood Walk of Fame at 6933 Hollywood Boulevard. It was dedicated February 8, 1960.

Filmography

Complete TV credits

Radio appearances

References

External links

 
 
 
 Dorothy McGuire appears on What's My Line July 25, 1954

1916 births
2001 deaths
American film actresses
American stage actresses
American television actresses
Actresses from Omaha, Nebraska
20th-century American actresses
Disney people